Sins of Yesterday is a 1922 German silent film directed by Robert Wüllner and starring Gina Relly, Alfred Gerasch, and Erich Kaiser-Titz.

Cast

References

Bibliography

External links

1922 films
Films of the Weimar Republic
German silent feature films
Films directed by Robert Wuellner
German black-and-white films
1920s German films